Bryan Hutson (born July 3, 1969 in Batesville, IN) is a gospel musician who has performed with The New Generation, The Heartland Quartet, The Blackwood Quartet and The Kingsmen Quartet.

Personal life
Virgil Bryan Hutson was born to the late JC Hutson and Norma "Cookie" Woods Hutson in Batesville, IN. Hutson grew up in southeastern Indiana with a love of gospel music and the church. He is married to Yvonne and they have four children.

Singing career

The New Generation
He began his career in Southern Gospel Music in 1982. His family group, “The Singing Woods Family”, traveled throughout Indiana, Ohio, Illinois, Kentucky, Tennessee and West Virginia. Hutson joined at age 13 as their drummer. They recorded one project, When The Clouds Roll Back.

Hutson helped form the group “The New Generation” in 1985. The older members of “The Singing Woods Family” decided to cease traveling and singing. He was the lead vocalist and drummer. “The New Generation” recorded seven musical projects. Hutson left the group in January 1993.

Hutson fills in for the Blackwood Quartet, meets and later joins "Heartland Quartet"
In March 1992, Hutson was asked to fill-in with “Ron Blackwood and The Blackwood Quartet”. There he met Brent Fredricks, George Amon Webster, Roy Tremble and Chuck Crain.

Fredricks, Webster, Tremble and Crain left the Blackwood Quartet and formed “The Heartland Quartet” On Easter Sunday 1992. Larry Thompson later joined the group.

In 1993 Hutson joined “The Heartland Quartet” and began touring nationally with Webster (Baritone), Tremble (Tenor), Fredricks (Bass Vocalist) and Rory Rigdon (bass player/soundman).

The Heartland Quartet/The Heartland Boys then onto The Kingsmen
Eldridge Fox (owner) of The Kingsmen Quartet produced recordings for Horizon Records out of Asheville, NC. Heartland recorded Back To Basics with Hutson as lead vocalist. The group appeared on Mainstage at the 1993 National Quartet Convention in Nashville, TN.

“The Heartland Quartet” was nominated “Favorite New Group” at the Singing News Fan Awards” in 1993. Their radio single; “It’s Time To Wake Up The Master” rose to #5 in the Singing News Magazine radio charts. 

In January 1994, Webster left The Heartland Quartet and returned to Florida to sing with his son Tim and brother Dannie Webster. In March, Hutson and Brent Fredricks joined the Websters and they renamed the group; “The Heartland Boys” in 1994.   This group recorded four projects: Nothing's Too Big For My God, America's Most Wanted, Full Speed Ahead and We Worship Live!. In 1994, Son Sound Studios (Bessemer City, NC) signed “The Heartland Boys” to a recording contract. The Homecoming and Follow The Leader were recorded in 1994 and 1995.

Eldridge Fox offered Hutson the lead vocalist position with “The Kingsmen Quartet” in 1996. Beyond The Clouds was Hutson's first recording with The Kingsmen. The album You’re Not Alone was recorded in 1997. The title song won Song Of The Year and Recorded Video Of The Year at the SGMA Award Show.

In 1997, The Singing News Magazine subscribers voted Hutson Favorite New Artist in the Singing News Fan Awards.

In September 1997, The Kingsmen appeared at The Grand Ol Opry with “Diamond Rio” and “Chubby Checker.”

The Kingsmen joined other East Coast groups as headliners in California and Red Deer, Alberta at the Great Western Quartet Convention and the Canadian Quartet Convention.

In 1998, The Kingsmen appeared with The Gaither Homecoming Group at The Georgia Dome in Atlanta, Georgia.

The Old Time Way was recorded in 1998 as part of The Kingsmen's weekly TV program (Kingsmen Korner Television) in Asheville, NC. It was a two-track recording.

Gadsden, AL was the location for "Big And Live Again". The new personnel, (Tenor) Jerry Martin, (Lead) Hutson, (Baritone) Jonathan, (Bass Vocal) Reese, (Drums) Fox, (Piano) Andrew Ishee, and (Bass Player) Jason Selph joined former Kingsmen members; Gary Dillard, Big Jim Hamill, Eldridge Fox and Randy Miller to sing many of the songs that the group had made famous in 1973 on the original "Big and Live."

Hutson performed on a total of 8, Top 10 songs during his first Kingsmen tenure. 
“I Stand Upon The Rock Of Ages”, “You’re Not Alone”, “I’ll Live Again”, “Sweet Peace”, “What I Found At The Altar”, “Getcha To The Other Side”, “The Next Cloud”-(#1) and “Joy’s Gonna Come In The Morning”.

“You’re Not Alone” was voted “Song Of The Year” at the SGMA Awards in 1998. 

The Kingsmen were inducted into the Gospel Music Association Hall Of Fame in 2000.

In May 2001, The Kingsmen made another appearance on The Grand Ol' Opry. Hutson resigned that weekend.  He accepted a position as Worship Minister in June 2001 at Gateway Church in West Virginia.

Ministry career
Hutson became the Worship Minister of the Gateway Church in West Virginia.

He formed the Gateway Vocal Union and The B Street Band with members of the congregation. A live album, Sacrifice Of Praise, was recorded in 2004.

Hutson recorded 3 solo albums, Then And Now, Grace and Home For The Holidays during his Gateway years.

Return to gospel music

Blackwood Gospel Quartet
In July 2005, Hutson joined “The Blackwood Gospel Quartet” based in Knoxville, TN. Members included Mark Blackwood, Derrick Boyd and Burman Porter. Additional vocalists Jonathan Sawrie, Brad Smith, Jeremy Calloway, Paul Lancaster and Randy Lewis all traveled with the group during Hutson's tenure.

Hutson returns to The Kingsmen Quartet
Hutson returned to “The Kingsmen Quartet” in 2007. Members included (Tenor) Jeremy Peace, (Lead) Phillip Hughes, (Bass) Ray Reese, (Piano) Nic Succi, (Bass guitar) Grant Barker and (Drums) Brandon Reese.

In 2008, the album When God Ran was recorded. "When God Ran" and "The Cloud He's Coming Back On" were voted in the Top Ten Songs of 2009 in the syndicated radio show Solid Gospel Radio.

The Kingsmen were inducted into “The Christian Music Hall Of Fame” in 2009.

In 2009, Hutson received a bachelor's degree in Theology from The North Carolina College of Theology.

In 2010, Missing People was recorded on the Crossroads Music and Entertainment label. "God Saw A Cross" went to #1 on the Signing News Magazine radio charts. "Missing People" (song) charted in the Top 10.

From 2007-2011, Hutson performed on 8 Top 10 songs. 
“When God Ran”-(#1) “The Cloud He’s Coming Back On”, “The Word”, “God Saw A Cross”-(#1) “Missing People” “Way Back To Grace”, “Loving Shepard, Gracious God” and “He’s Everything I Need”-(#1)

Soul'd Out Quartet and Rescue Me Ministries
Hutson left The Kingsmen in 2011 and joined Soul'd Out Quartet.

In 2016, Soul’d Out performed for the ribbon cutting ceremony for The Ark Exhibit in Williamston, KY. 

He left the group in 2016.

Rescue Me Ministries

Bryan and his wife Yvonne travel and minister as “Rescue Me Ministries.”

They present musical concerts, lead worship, and host Marriage Enrichment Events (Marriage 3.0) across America. 

Bryan and Yvonne have performed at “The Creation Museum” during their “ChristmasTown” holiday event.  

They host, emcee and perform on “The Singing At Sea” gospel cruise. 

They have recorded seven musical projects: Still Makin’ Some Noise, For Always and Forever, You Rescued Me, Grace, His Story, Hope and Noel.
www.rescuemeministries.com

References

External links
Soul'd Out Quartet

Living people
American male singers
Singers from Indiana
American performers of Christian music
Southern gospel performers
1969 births
American gospel musicians
People from Batesville, Indiana